The Audacity to Podcast is a weekly in-depth podcast about podcasting. The show launched on June 17, 2010 and is hosted by Daniel J. Lewis. It contains podcasting tutorials, comparisons, news, reviews, and more to help people launch or improve their own podcasts.

Recognition 
In 2012, The Audacity to Podcast won the Podcast Award for #1 technology podcast. Since then, it has been a nominated finalist for numerous awards in the People's Choice Podcast Awards and The Academy of Podcasters Awards.

The Audacity to Podcast has been referenced as an authoritative podcasting resource in articles on Lifehacker, Buffer, and other blogs and podcasts. It was also covered in Cincinnati-based news media in Lewis's association with International Podcast Day.

References

External links 
 

Audio podcasts
Video podcasts
Technology podcasts
2010 podcast debuts
American podcasts